Sue Murphy is an American stand-up comedian who has worked on such shows as Short Attention Span Theater, The Jeff Foxworthy Show, Comedy Central Presents and Wanda Does It. She is also a producer and writer on The Ellen DeGeneres Show, The Class and Wanda at Large and appeared in the movie Nine Months. In 2001, she was honored with a nomination for the American Comedy Award for Best Female Stand-up.

She is an executive producer of Chelsea Lately, and appeared on camera at the end of the episode that was broadcast on 14 December 2012. In 2016, Murphy performed at a fundraiser for presidential candidate Hillary Clinton. She is an executive producer on Chelsea, Chelsea Handler's talk show on Netflix.

References

External links
 

American television actresses
Living people
Year of birth missing (living people)
American women comedians
University of California, Davis alumni
WFTV Award winners
21st-century American women